Warrior Woman is a fictional character appearing in American comic books published by Marvel Comics.

Publication history

Warrior Woman first appears in Invaders #16 (May 1977) and was created by Roy Thomas and Frank Robbins. She is brought back later in Squadron Supreme.

Fictional character biography
Julia Koenig first appears in a multi-issue storyline in the title Invaders, posing as a servicewoman dating an American soldier in London during World War II. Koenig is revealed to be a Nazi spy, code-named Madame Rätsel (Madame Mystery), who is sent to obtain information from a soldier, who was also a cartoonist and is suspected of knowing the secret of the Super-Soldier Serum, which originally empowered hero Captain America. The soldier is captured and interrogated by Koenig, who attempts to replicate the experiment in a laboratory. The materials used are unstable, and when a superior officer intervenes, trying to stop Koenig from using the formula on herself, she whips him, accidentally throwing him into the machinery, causing an explosion that transforms Koenig into a female version of fellow Nazi agent Master Man (although courtesy of a higher level of exposure to the Serum, Master Man is physically superior). Koenig dubs herself Warrior Woman.

To celebrate the capture of superhero team the Invaders (in a prison in Berlin), Hitler insists Koenig and Master Man marry, his logic being that they are the progenitors of a new race. The ceremony, however, is interrupted when the priest is killed by rubble from a building damaged during a battle between the Invaders and German troops. Warrior Woman and Master Man retreat when confronted by the Human Torch, who becomes enraged when his ward, Toro, is wounded by gunfire. The character reappears in the final issue of the Invaders as part of a team formed by the Japanese spy Lady Lotus to battle the heroes - the Super-Axis.

It is revealed in a flashback from Namor the Sub-Mariner, that near the end of World War II, Baron Strucker placed Warrior Woman and Master Man in suspended animation in a hidden laboratory, thereby "preserving" the Nazi dream for use at a later time. Master Man is revived by Axl Nacht's scientists, and at Nacht's direction, the character abducts the original Human Torch and Ann Raymond (Toro's widow) - their blood being necessary for reviving Warrior Woman, who had suffered brain damage. Nacht betrays Master Man when it is revealed that his father first cared for the two superbeings while in suspended animation, and unknowingly instilled in the younger Nacht an obsession with Warrior Woman.

In another flashback, Warrior Woman assisted Master Man and Armless Tiger Man into partaking in the invasion of Wakanda where they fought Captain America, T'Chaka, and Sgt. Fury and his Howling Commandos.

When Namor the Sub-Mariner, former founding member of the Invaders, finds the laboratory, he battles Master Man until the Nazi loses his abilities and reverts to Wilhelm Lohmer. Nacht steals Master Man's abilities for himself, and has apparently also won the affections of the revived, but unstable Warrior Woman. Namor rescues the prisoners as Lohmer destroys the laboratory, although no bodies are found in the wreckage.

Later, she resurfaces alongside Nacht (now wearing armor) as one of the leaders of Axis Mundi, a resurgent fascist terrorist organization who was opposed by the New Invaders. Other members of Axis Mundi included U-Man, Baroness Blood (female heir to Baron Blood) and the Pterrorists, an army of cloned insectoid warriors whose mind and DNA were derived from Agent Axis.

Sometime later she kills Power Princess and assumes her identity, then joins the Squadron Supreme and is taken to Weirdworld, where she reveals her true colors and betrays the team, but is defeated.

Powers and abilities
Julia Koenig was a normal human who excelled at espionage and hypnotism, and when exposed to a variant of the Super-Soldier Serum receives enhanced strength and stamina.

References

External links
 Warrior Woman at Marvel Wiki
 Warrior Woman at Comic Vine
 Warrior Woman aka Kriegerfrau

Characters created by Frank Robbins
Characters created by Roy Thomas
Comics characters introduced in 1977
Fictional women soldiers and warriors
Marvel Comics characters with superhuman strength
Marvel Comics female supervillains
Marvel Comics Nazis
Marvel Comics supervillains